Ash Township is one of twenty-five townships in Barry County, Missouri, United States. As of the 2000 census, its population was 876.

Ash Township was established in 1870, and named after an early settler with the surname Ash.

Geography

The stream of Greasy Creek runs through this township.

References

 USGS Geographic Names Information System (GNIS)

External links
 US-Counties.com
 City-Data.com

Townships in Barry County, Missouri
Townships in Missouri